Terry Anne Meeuwsen Friedrich (born March 2, 1949) is an American television personality, co-host of the Christian Broadcasting Network (CBN)'s 700 Club, author and singer.

Meeuwsen was the 1972 Miss Appleton, 1972 Miss Wisconsin and the winner of the Miss America pageant in 1973, taking both the talent and swimsuit competitions. She was the first Miss Wisconsin delegate to hold the Miss America title.

Life and career 
At De Pere High School, Meeuwsen was selected homecoming queen, and was also a cheerleader for three years. After graduation, between 1969 and 1971, Meeuwsen performed and traveled with the singing group The New Christy Minstrels, but left the group to enter the Miss America pageant preliminary competitions.

Following her reign as Miss America, Meeuwsen began television work at WTMJ-TV in Milwaukee in 1978, co-hosting (with Pete Wilson) a daily morning news and feature program, "A New Day." She left the station in 1986.

Meeuwsen then accepted a position at The Christian Broadcasting Network (CBN) in Virginia Beach, VA, as co-host of "USAM," a proposed news and features program, with veteran newsman Brian Christie joining her as co-host. With broadcast veterans Tom Mahoney (Weather), Scott Hatch (Sports) and feature reporters Scott Ross and Ross Bagley, USAM offered personality programming with a faith perspective. The 30-minute daily morning show was sold to network affiliates (ABC, CBS, NBC) for access via satellite as a lead-in to their popular morning network shows. (At the time, affiliates typically aired color bars from the previous night's sign-off until the morning network feed began; offering high-profile personality programming to early morning viewers soon led to networks developing their own proprietary lead-ins.)

After appearing on The 700 Club several times in the late 1980s and early 1990s as a guest co-host, she became a permanent co-host in 1993, sitting daily beside CBN founder Pat Robertson. Since 2000, she has co-hosted the CBN show, Living the Life, with comedian Louise DuArt. Both shows air on Freeform. On September 12, 1995, Meeuwsen released the inspirational pop recording, Eyes of My Heart. She has also authored four books, including Christmas Memories (1996), Near to the Heart Of God (1998), Just Between Friends (1999), and The God Adventure (2005). Meeuwsen serves as director of Orphan's Promise, a part of CBN aimed at helping orphans and vulnerable children around the world through academic programs; life skills training; mentoring and career placement; food and clothing assistance; health care programs; housing; and orphan and adoption advocacy.

Personal life
Meeuwsen and her husband, Andy Friedrich, have seven children. The marriage is the second for each. The couple has strongly advocated adoption, and most of their children are adopted from difficult backgrounds. Their youngest three girls were adopted from Ukraine.

References

External links
Terry Meewusen biography at CBN.com
Terry Meeuwsen as a member of the New Christy Minstrels

1949 births
Living people
American Christian writers
American television talk show hosts
Journalists from Wisconsin
Miss America 1970s delegates
Miss America Preliminary Talent winners
Miss America winners
People from De Pere, Wisconsin
St. Norbert College alumni
Writers from Wisconsin
American people of Dutch descent
The New Christy Minstrels members